The Kilbourn Tower is a 33-story,  building in Milwaukee, Wisconsin. The building was completed in 2005, and at the time of its completion, it was the tallest residential building in Wisconsin. It would be surpassed by the University Club Tower the following year. The Kilbourn Tower is designed by LA DALLMAN, the architecture practice of Grace La and James Dallman, and built in a modernist style. At the time of its construction in 2006, Kilbourn Tower was considered the 5th tallest building designed by a woman. Kilbourn Tower is located at the key intersection of Prospect and Kilbourn, overlooking Solomon Juneau Park and the Milwaukee lakefront.  The building is centrally located and offers pedestrian access to the Milwaukee central business district.

See also

List of tallest buildings in Milwaukee

References

Residential buildings completed in 2005
Residential skyscrapers in Milwaukee
2005 establishments in Wisconsin